Aleksei Vladimirovich Gorodovoy (born 10 August 1993) is a Russian football goalkeeper who plays for FC Fakel Voronezh.

Club career
He made his debut in the Russian Second Division for FC Dynamo Stavropol on 18 April 2012 in a game against FC Biolog-Novokubansk Progress.

On 31 January 2019, he joined Russian Premier League club FC Rubin Kazan. For the rest of the 2018–29 season he was loaned to FC Zenit Saint Petersburg. He made his Russian Football National League debut for FC Zenit-2 Saint Petersburg on 3 March 2019 in a game against FC Shinnik Yaroslavl. On 17 June 2020 he joined FC Veles Moscow on loan for the 2020–21 season. On 25 January 2021, the loan was terminated. On 27 January 2021, he joined FC SKA-Khabarovsk on loan.

On 7 December 2021, he signed with FC Fakel Voronezh. Gorodovoy made his Russian Premier League debut for Fakel on 17 July 2022 against FC Krasnodar.

Career statistics

References

External links
 
 
 

1993 births
Sportspeople from Stavropol
Living people
Russian footballers
Association football goalkeepers
FC Dynamo Stavropol players
FC Sakhalin Yuzhno-Sakhalinsk players
PFC Spartak Nalchik players
Kongsvinger IL Toppfotball players
FC Zenit-2 Saint Petersburg players
FC Rubin Kazan players
FC Veles Moscow players
FC SKA-Khabarovsk players
FC Fakel Voronezh players
Russian Second League players
Norwegian First Division players
Russian First League players
Russian Premier League players
Russian expatriate footballers
Expatriate footballers in Norway
Russian expatriate sportspeople in Norway